Niels Stockfleth Schultz (14 March 1780 – 30 May 1832) was a Norwegian cleric, author and politician.

Biography
Niels Stockfleth Schultz was born in Krødsherad in Buskerud and grew up in nearby Sigdal. His father, Ole Schultz (1737–97) was a  parish priest. His mother,  Anne Kirstine Stockfleth, died when he was five years old and his father when he was 17. He was a pupil at the Cathedral School in Christiania, (now Oslo). He came to the attention of Niels Treschow who arranged for Marcus Gjøe Rosenkrantz to pay for his education. He graduated in theology  at University of Copenhagen during 1802. In 1807 he published a textbook on the  English language and later an English grammar. He also wrote a Danish-Norwegian language text and a Biblical text. In 1809, he was appointed resident chaplain  at Vår Frue Church in Trondheim, an office he held until his death.

Schultz was first elected to represent Trondhjem at the Norwegian Constituent Assembly at Eidsvoll in 1814. He continued to attend  parliamentary assemblies (except in 1821) until 1830. In 1827, he served as President of the Parliament.
Schultz was a member of Royal Norwegian Society of Sciences and Letters from 1811, serving as secretary from 1813-1815; Praeses from  1829–1832.

Selected works
Praktisk Engelsk Sproglære,  1807
Prædikener, 1823
Engelsk Grammatik,  1826
Kortfattet Norsk Sproglære, 1826

References

1780 births
1832 deaths
People from Buskerud
People from Krødsherad
Presidents of the Storting
Norwegian priest-politicians
Royal Norwegian Society of Sciences and Letters
University of Copenhagen alumni